The Main–Yankee Street Historic District is a historic district that encompasses an antebellum residential section of Gainesville, Sumter County, Alabama. The district was listed on the National Register of Historic Places on October 3, 1985.

Description
Gainesville lies on the south bank of the Tombigbee River in southwestern Alabama.  It reached its zenith prior to the American Civil War; when it was an important inland port, before the wide-scale introduction of railroads.

The Main–Yankee Street Historic District is one of two historic districts in the town, the other being the Gainesville Historic District.  The district is centered on Main Street, also known as Yankee Street.  Architectural styles present include Federal and Greek Revival. The contributing properties in the district are the Russell-Woodruff-Turrentine House, circa 1835–40; Lewis-Jones-Fields House, circa 1840–50; Lewis-Long House, circa 1835–40; Falls House, circa 1840–50; and Howard-Goodloe-Bolton House, circa 1840–50.

References

External links

Federal architecture in Alabama
Greek Revival architecture in Alabama
National Register of Historic Places in Sumter County, Alabama
Historic districts in Sumter County, Alabama
Historic districts on the National Register of Historic Places in Alabama